Nicolas Savinaud (born 20 November 1975) is a French former professional footballer who spent most of his career at FC Nantes. Mostly deployed as a defender, he also played in other positions.

Career
Born in Fontenay-le-Comte, Vendée, Savinaud began his career in 1991 in the youth teams of FC Nantes. In the 1995–96 season he was promoted to the first team. He played in the victorious 1999 and 2000 Coupe de France campaigns and contributed 25 appearances as his side won the 2000–01 French Division 1. He also won the Trophée des Champions in 1999 and 2001, scoring in the 2001 edition.

In June 2007, with his contract running out, Savinaud moved to Guingamp as a free agent, where he played until 14 January 2009 when he moved to Vannes OC.

On 9 August 2009, he left Vannes OC and signed for USJA Carquefou.

Style of play
Savinaud was well known for his ability to play in any position on the field, and was called the "homme à tout faire".

Career statistics

Honours
Nantes
 Ligue 1: 2001
 Coupe de France: 1999, 2000
 Trophée des Champions: 1999, 2001
 Cup of the Alps runners-up: 2004

References

External links
 
 

1975 births
Living people
People from Fontenay-le-Comte
Sportspeople from Vendée
French footballers
Footballers from Pays de la Loire
Association football midfielders
Association football defenders
Ligue 1 players
Ligue 2 players
FC Nantes players
En Avant Guingamp players
Vannes OC players
USJA Carquefou players